Sada Williams (born 1 December 1997) is a Barbadian sprinter competing primarily in the 200 and 400 metres. She won the bronze medal in the 400 m at the 2022 World Championships, becoming the first Barbadian woman ever to win a medal at the World Athletics Championships. Williams took a gold in the event at the 2022 Commonwealth Games.

She represented her country at the 2017 World Athletics Championships without reaching the semifinals.

Williams competed at the 2020 Tokyo Olympics.

She had a breakthrough 2022 season, finishing third in the 400 m at the World Championships Eugene 2022 in July. She improved her own national record to 49.75 seconds, coming home only behind Shaunae Miller-Uibo (49.11 s) and Marileidy Paulino who ran a time of 49.60 s. About two weeks later at the 2022 Commonwealth Games in Birmingham, Williams won the title in a Games record time of 49.90 seconds. She continued her fine season in August by claiming silver behind only Miller-Uibo (49.40 s) at the NACAC Championships in Freeport, Bahamas, with a time of 49.86 seconds.

International competitions

1Disqualified in the final
2Did not finish in the final

Personal bests
 100 metres – 11.66 (0.0 m/s, St. Michael 2017)
 200 metres – 22.61 (+1.6 m/s, St. Michael 2016) 
 400 metres – 49.75 (Eugene, OR 2022)

References

External links

1997 births
Living people
Barbadian female sprinters
World Athletics Championships athletes for Barbados
Athletes (track and field) at the 2014 Summer Youth Olympics
Athletes (track and field) at the 2015 Pan American Games
Athletes (track and field) at the 2019 Pan American Games
Athletes (track and field) at the 2020 Summer Olympics
Pan American Games competitors for Barbados
Olympic female sprinters
Sportspeople from Bridgetown
Olympic athletes of Barbados
Commonwealth Games gold medallists for Barbados
Commonwealth Games medallists in athletics
Athletes (track and field) at the 2022 Commonwealth Games
Medallists at the 2022 Commonwealth Games